Pacific University Press is a university press affiliated with Pacific University, located in Forest Grove, Oregon. Operated by the university's library, the press was formally established in 2015 and built off the library's established journal publishing initiative (which began in 2009). The publisher is currently a member of the Library Publishing Coalition.

See also

 List of English-language book publishing companies
 List of university presses

References

External links 
Pacific University Press

Pacific University Press
Oregon